Lantiq was a Germany-based fabless semiconductor company of approximately 1,000 people formed via a spin-out from Infineon Technologies. The company was purchased in 2015 by Intel for $345M.

Corporate history
On July 7, 2009, Infineon Technologies announced that it agreed to sell its wire-based communications division to Golden Gate Capital, resulting in a new stand-alone name of Lantiq  This was one of several steps to raise cash during the Great Recession.
Some technology had been acquired when Infineon purchased Taiwan-based ADMTek (partially owned by Accton Technology Corporation) for approximately US$100 million in cash in 2004.

Some assets and patents acquired from Massachusetts-based Aware Inc for about US$6.75 million were included in the spinoff.
The division was headed by Christian Wolff when the deal closed on November 6, 2009 for about 243 million Euros.

Lantiq's central functions and the executive management team were located in Neubiberg, near Munich Germany.

In May 2012, Dan Artusi from Conexant replaced Wolff as chief executive.

On Feb 2, 2015, it was announced that Intel agreed to buy Lantiq (a transaction valued at $345 million) in an attempt to expand its range of chips used in connected Internet-of-Things gadgets and IoT gateways.

Intel sold the business to MaxLinear in 2020.

Markets 
Lantiq made semiconductor products for computer networks used by common carrier telecommunications companies in access networks and home networking.

Their products included SOC's (system-on-a-chip) and other integrated circuits for technologies including the digital subscriber line family, VoIP, wireless LAN, Gigabit Ethernet and passive optical networks. 

In January 2011 Lantiq announced home networking technology compliant with the ITU-T G.hn standard using the brand name XWAY HNX.

See also

 OpenWrt
 Qualcomm Atheros
 MediaTek
 Ingenic Semiconductor
 STMicroelectronics
 Texas Instruments

References

External links
 Lantiq's web site
 OpenWrt Wiki: Lantiq SoCs
 OpenWrt Track: Lantiq

Semiconductor companies of Germany
Fabless semiconductor companies
Multinational companies headquartered in Germany
Technology companies established in 2009
Computer memory companies
2015 mergers and acquisitions
2009 establishments in Germany
Technology companies disestablished in 2015
2015 disestablishments in Germany
Intel acquisitions